The following is a list of the 13 cantons of the Ariège department, in France, following the French canton reorganisation which came into effect in March 2015:

 Arize-Lèze
 Couserans Est
 Couserans Ouest
 Foix
 Haute-Ariège
 Mirepoix
 Pamiers-1
 Pamiers-2
 Pays d'Olmes
 Portes d'Ariège
 Portes du Couserans
 Sabarthès
 Val d'Ariège

References